Sener may refer to:

 SENER, Construction & engineering company of Spain
 Şener, Turkish name